The Pope's Worldwide Prayer Network is a Pontifical Society of the Catholic Church, which encourages Catholics to prayer and action as part of the church's universal mission. The Network provides monthly prayer intentions determined by the Pope. It is particularly inspired by devotions to the Sacred Heart of Jesus and his compassion for the world.

Founded in 1844 as the Apostleship of Prayer and renamed in 2016, this ecclesiastic service became a pontifical work in March 2018 when Pope Francis approved the new statutes. In December 2020, the Pope constituted this Pontifical Society as a Vatican Foundation. The PWPN includes the branch specifically dedicated to young people aged between seven and 18: the Eucharistic Youth Movement (EYM) and is present in 89 countries with a membership of more than 22 million Catholics worldwide.

The International Director of the PWPN is Frédéric Fornos, SJ, who was appointed in 2016.

History: The Apostleship of Prayer

The beginnings 
The Pope's Worldwide Prayer Network, originally called the Apostleship of Prayer, was founded in 1844 in the south of France; in a house of formation for young Jesuits in Vals-près-le-Puy. The initiative was first proposed by a Jesuit priest, Francis Xavier Gautrelet, who at the time was the spiritual director of the students. On the eve of the feast day of Saint Francis Xavier (2 December 1844), he outlined the original idea to them in meditation. This initiative was later developed into the Apostleship of Prayer, and now today, into the Pope's Worldwide Prayer Network.

The concrete practice that Father Gautrelet suggested to his students to keep this spirit alive was a prayer every morning to offer up the day.

Further developments 
In 1861, Jesuit Father Henri Ramière provided a new dynamism for the Apostleship and framed this proposal in a missionary perspective: devotion to the Sacred Heart of Jesus. It was Father Ramiére who formalized and structured the Apostleship of Prayer; thus he is considered, after Father Gautrelet, a second founder. By that time the Apostleship already had 13 million members.

The practices of the Apostleship of Prayer spread widely among local farmers and young Christians in the countryside around Vals-près-le-Puy. In just a few years, this prayer proposal gained popularity throughout the country and reached millions of followers worldwide. Apostleship of Prayer groups formed in Catholic parishes and institutions while the original idea took on a visible structured form as an ecclesiastic association.

The Pope’s prayer intentions 

Between 1890 and 1896, Pope Leo XIII became interested in participating in this immense network of Catholics offering their lives and their dedication to spiritually supporting the mission of the Church. He incorporated the Apostleship as a special mission of the Pope and entrusted the association to the Society of Jesus in the person of the Father General. Furthermore, he began to commend a monthly prayer intention to the Apostleship of Prayer where he expressed his concerns and asked all Catholics to pray for them.

The process of recreation: the Pope’s Worldwide Prayer Network 
From 2010 onwards, a process of reflection and discernment commenced with the participation of national directors and coordinators to accommodate the Apostleship of Prayer in today's world. The proposal presented to Pope Francis in 2014 suggested the introduction of the “Pope’s Worldwide Prayer Network”, which was finally established in 2015 with a new logo.

On Sunday 8 January 2017, during the Angelus in St Peters Square, Pope Francis used the new name for the first time when he urged the faithful the world over to unite with him in prayer.“I would also like to invite you to join in the Pope’s Worldwide Prayer Network, which spreads, also through social networks, the prayer intentions I propose for the Church each month. In this way, the Apostleship of Prayer moves forward and communion grows”.Then in 2018, Pope Francis declared the Pope's Worldwide Prayer Network, formerly known as the Apostleship of Prayer, a pontifical work with official headquarters in the State of the City of the Vatican. In December 2020, the Pope constituted this Pontifical Society as a Vatican Foundation.

The 175th Anniversary 
On 28 June 2019, Pope Francis welcomed a delegation of his Worldwide Prayer Network to the Vatican on the 175th anniversary of the founding of the original Apostleship of Prayer. More than 6,000 delegates attended, along with another 7,500 members following on Facebook live.

The Holy See announced on 3 December 2020 that the Pope had established the Worldwide Prayer Network Foundation as an entity with a juridical identity.

The Eucharistic Youth Movement 
The Eucharistic Youth Movement (EYM) is the youth branch of the Pope's Worldwide Prayer Network. The EYM helps its members (aged seven to 18) to deepen their relationship with Jesus according to the Spiritual Exercises of Saint Ignatius.

The origins of the EYM go back to 1914, when the International Eucharist Congress of Lourdes called for “a great Eucharistic league of the very young, who from childhood onwards would reawaken a general movement towards Holy Communion." Beginning at that Eucharistic Congress, groups known as “Eucharistic leagues” or “Children’s Prayer Crusades” were formed. Some of these were connected to the Apostleship of Prayer. The Eucharistic Crusade (founded 1915) was originally part of the Bordeaux Crusade; now it is part of EYM.

Initiatives and projects 
The renewal process for the Pope's Worldwide Prayer Network strives to increase access to digital communication to reach young people. Consequently, several media initiatives and apps were launched.

Click To Pray 

Click To Pray, launched on March 4, 2016, is an app to help people pray for the Pope's monthly intentions. The app also offers teaching aids for daily prayer and coordinates the prayer intentions of millions through the “wall of prayer”. Click To Pray is available in seven languages and is present on most social media. It also has its own blog and newsletter.

The Pope Video 

The Pope Video is an initiative that seeks to share the Pope's monthly prayer intentions. In a monthly video, the Pope faces the camera to ask for prayers. The first video was launched in January 2016. It has its own website.

Click To Pray eRosary 
Click To Pray eRosary is an application in five languages. It encourages people to pray the rosary for peace in the world. The app was launched in October 2019.

The Way of the Heart 
The Way of the Heart is an application and website in Spanish which offers digital books connected to the Pope's Worldwide Prayer Network.

Notes

External links
Apostleship of Prayer | U.S. Website
Youth and Young Adult Ministry of the Apostleship of Prayer in the U.S.
Apostleship of Prayer | International Website
Apostleship of Prayer Collection at the University of Dayton Archives

Religious organizations established in 1844
Catholic organizations established in the 19th century
1844 establishments in France
Christian missionary societies
Associations of the Christian faithful